Mary Ann Throne (born c. 1960) is a Democratic former member of the Wyoming House of Representatives, representing the 11th district from 2007 until 2017. In August 2017, Throne announced her candidacy for Governor of Wyoming in the 2018 election. She easily won the Democratic primary on August 21, 2018. On November 6, 2018, she was defeated in the general election by Republican State Treasurer Mark Gordon.

Biography
Throne was born and raised in Campbell County, Wyoming on a ranch on Wild Horse Creek. She graduated with an A.B. in history from Princeton University in 1982 after completing a senior thesis titled "Wyoming Water Laws, 1888-1910: Public Ownership of Water for Irrigation Use." She then received a law degree from Columbia Law School. After college she spent two years volunteering in Thailand, and then moved back to Wyoming to work as an Assistant Wyoming Attorney General in the state, serving in that role from 1992 to 1999.

Throne was elected to the Wyoming House of Representatives in 2006 and was defeated for reelection by Jared Olsen in 2016. She ran for Governor of Wyoming in the 2018 election, but was defeated by then-State Treasurer Mark Gordon. In 2019, Gordon named Throne to a vacancy on the Wyoming Public Service Commission.

References

External links
Wyoming State Legislature - Representative Mary Throne official WY Senate website
Mary Throne for Governor Campaign Website
Project Vote Smart - Representative Mary Throne (WY) profile
Follow the Money - Mary Throne
2006 campaign contributions

|-

1960 births
21st-century American politicians
21st-century American women politicians
Columbia Law School alumni
Living people
Democratic Party members of the Wyoming House of Representatives
Princeton University alumni
Women state legislators in Wyoming
Candidates in the 2018 United States elections
People from Gillette, Wyoming